Karina Vladimirova Razumovskaya (born 9 March 1983) is a Russian theater and film actress.

Biography
Karina Razumovskaya was born in Leningrad, Russian SFSR, Soviet Union (now Saint Petersburg, Russia)
As a young girl in 1989, she made her debut in the film "Slowing Down in the Heavens".
When she finished school, she entered the Russian State Institute of Performing Arts after which, in 2004, began working at the Tovstonogov Bolshoi Drama Theater.

Personal life
She plays the guitar. Razumoskaya is married, and her husband is named Artyom.

Filmography

References

External links 
 

1983 births
Living people
Actresses from Saint Petersburg
Russian film actresses
Russian television actresses
Russian stage actresses
21st-century Russian actresses